Bruce Irving (born 19 August 1932) is a New Zealand cricketer. He played in nineteen first-class matches for Canterbury from 1962 to 1973.

See also
 List of Canterbury representative cricketers

References

External links
 

1932 births
Living people
New Zealand cricketers
Canterbury cricketers
Cricketers from Christchurch